Amit Kadel (born 10 November 1992), better known by his stage name Akade, is an Indian DJ and record producer.

Early life
Akade was born in a non-musical family of Kolkata, India. He started music from his school days. He was fascinated by the new trend and day by day his interest increased towards music and later his passion turned in to his profession, started Djing in 2010, playing at various private parties. In 2014 he started a music project named "Akade".

Career
Akade is the first artist in Kolkata, who took the dance music to the international level. His single 'All Or Nothing' had climbed up on Beatport Top 100 charts. The track was with Thimlife and Bibiane Z released on 2dutch's Musical Madness. He has got featured on the radio shows of the top notch artists like Tiesto, Hardwell, Nicky Romero, Blasterjaxx, Ummet Ozcan, Sick Individuals, Yves Van Geertsom, Firebeatz and Tritonal (group) to name a few.

Akade has performed alongside DJ Snake, KSHMR, Martin Garrix, Nucleya & other top ranked international acts. He is also known for his live performances at popular events like Sunburn Festival and other reputed college campuses.

In 2019 Akade released tracks "Together" with Bibiane Z,
"Die For Love" with Alex Holmes and "Wobble Ma Head" with Mr. Vegas & PABLO.

In 2021 Akade released Summer song with Claire Frances, and the song was selected by BBC Music Introducing (The South) and premiered on BBC Radio Surrey & BBC Radio Sussex.

In the end of the year 2021, Akade released a party anthem ‘Do It Like I Do’ featuring Italian artist Ellynora. The song was featured on Rolling Stone India.

Discography
Akade discography

'Hands Up' (2014), Aaroh Music
'All Or Nothing' (2015) with Thimlife & Bibiane Z, Musical Madness, 2dutch
'Wanderers' (2016), with Thimlife, PYRO Records
'Goodbye' (2016), with Above Fact & Bibiane Z, Musical Madness, 2dutch 
'Mantra' (2016), PYRO Records
'Life Goes On' (2017), with Krimsonn & Bibiane Z), Musical Madness, 2dutch 
'Brain Freeze' (2017), with PABLO
'Laakhon' (2017), with Cenix
'Vendetta' (2018), with Cenix
'Euphony' (2018)
'Together' (2019), with Bibiane Z, Time Records
'Wobble Ma Head' (2019), with Mr. Vegas & PABLO
'Die For Love' (2019), with Alex Holmes
 ‘The Girl Look Good’ (2019) 
 ‘Bacardi’ (2019), with A-bazz & PABLO
 ‘Befikar’ (2020), with Mitika Kanwar 
 ‘Befikar Edit ( Sean Akshay )’ (2020), with Mitika Kanwar 
 ‘Na Koi Jaane’ (2020), with B-Leaf 
 ‘Phir Se Udd Chala’ (2020), with B-Leaf 
 ‘Float Away’ (2021), with Claire Frances
 ‘Get Me Ready’ (2021) 
 ‘Ride’ (2021)
 'Na Koi Jaane (Akade Remix)' (2021) with B-Leaf
 ‘Do It Like I Do’ (2021) with Ellynora
 ‘Do It Like I Do (Akade VIP Mix)’ (2022) with Ellynora
 'Not Alone' (2022) with Nick Montag
 'The Other Side' (2022) with Izzy Eyre

References

External links

Indian DJs
Indian record producers
People from Kolkata
1992 births
Living people